Karina  Fiorella Jordán Manrique (Lima, December 18, 1985) is a Peruvian actress.

She studied at the Pontifical Catholic University of Peru.

TV
Baila Reggaettón (2007) as Vanessa
Golpe A Golpe (2007) as Belén Meléndez
Sabrosas (2008) as Joselyn
La Fuerza Fénix (2008) as Rina Sipagauta
Clave Uno: Médicos En Alerta (2009) as Marcela Piqueras
Ven Baila Quinceañera (2016) as Cristina Romero
My three Maries as Emma
Los Vilchez 2 (2019) as Erica
Caiga quien caiga as Marina

Theatre
Laberinto de mounstruos (2003)
La Orestiada (2008)
La Prisión de los Ángeles (2008)
La Nona (2008)
El Mentiroso (2008)
La asombrosa fábula del Rey Ciervo (2009) ... Ángela
Rent (2010)

References

External links

1985 births
Living people
21st-century Peruvian actresses
Actresses from Lima
Peruvian stage actresses
Peruvian television actresses